Demetris Spyridakis (born 16 September 2004) is a Cypriot footballer who plays as a forward for MEAP Nisou, on loan from Omonia.

Career 
Aged 17, Spyridakis signed his first contract as a professional footballer on 7 July 2022, with Omonia. In September, he was loaned out to Second Division side MEAP Nisou, for the duration of the 2022–23 season.

Career Statistics

References 

2004 births
Living people
Sportspeople from Nicosia
Cypriot footballers
Association football forwards
AC Omonia players
MEAP Nisou players